Weikersheim is a town in the Main-Tauber district of Baden-Württemberg, Germany.

History
Town rights were granted to Weikersheim in 1313. As the one of the seats of the House of Hohenlohe, until 1756 Weikersheim's town center was dominated by Weikersheim Castle, residence of the Hohenlohe-Weikersheim line. From 1 January 1972 to 1 January 1975, Weikersheim incorporated eight municipalities. In that time, and as a result Weikersheim was assigned to the newly-created Main-Tauber district. In 2000, the old town and palace were placed under protection as cultural monuments.

Geography
The lowest elevation above sea level in the municipal area,  Normalnull (NN), is found on the Tauber, near . The highest elevation, is found to the south-east, near the border with Oberndorf (Weikersheim).

Part of the federally-protected  nature reserve is located within Weikersheim's municipal area.

Coat of arms
Weikersheim's coat of arms displays a large "W" in silver below a golden crown upon a field of red. The first seal associated with Weikersheim is dated to 1435 and contained the "W", but from 1593 onward, it was supported by two lions and positioned above images of the Sun, Moon, and the planet Mercury. On 7 November 1949, the State of Baden-Württemberg awarded Weikersheim a coat of arms based on the original pattern, but with a new red-silver tincture. This pattern and tincture was affirmed on 31 May 1968 by the approval of the Federal Ministry of the Interior.

See also
 Weikersheim Castle

Citations

External links

  (in German)

Main-Tauber-Kreis
Württemberg